Albin meteorite is a meteorite found in Laramie County, Wyoming, United States.

See also 
 Glossary of meteoritics

References

External links 
 Meteoritical Bulletin Database
 Encyclopedia of Meteorites
 Albin - Meteorites Studies

Meteorites found in the United States
Geology of Wyoming